The 2011 USARL season was the inaugural season of the USA Rugby League (USARL). The league was formed in January 2011 as a breakaway competition from the American National Rugby League (AMNRL). The regular season kicked off on June 4 and ended on July 30; the Jacksonville Axemen won the minor premiership with the best regular season record. The first round of playoffs were played on August 13, 2011, with the New Haven Warriors and Philadelphia Fight winning the round. The league's Grand Final took place on August 27 between the Philadelphia Fight and the New Haven Warriors. Philadelphia won 28–26, receiving their first national championship.

Teams

Season table

Ladder progression

Numbers highlighted in green indicate that the team finished the round inside the top 4.
Numbers highlighted in blue indicates the team finished first on the ladder in that round.
Numbers highlighted in red indicates the team finished last place on the ladder in that round.

Regular season
The inaugural USARL season opened with a pre-season rugby league nines tournament. Seven of the top-tier teams participated, with the Philadelphia Fight fielding two teams. Additionally, two developmental teams (the Orange County Outlaws and the Utah Avalanche) participated, along with a West Chester University student team and the visiting New Zealand Police invitational side. The New Zealand Police won the tournament over the New Haven Warriors.

For the regular season, each team played home and away against six teams once, and one team twice, in an eight-round home and away season. Teams qualified for the playoffs based on point differential, with a win counting for 2 points, a draw for 1, a loss for 0, and a forfeit for −2. The Jacksonville Axemen won the minor premiers with the best season record.

Round 1

Round 2

Round 3

Round 4

Round 5

Round 6

Round 7

Round 8

Playoffs
The playoffs consist of a two-round single-elimination tournament in August. The season's top four teams competed in a semi-final round, with the two winners going on to the Championship Final. In the first round on August 13, the first-place Jacksonville Axemen hosted fourth-place New Haven Warriors at Hodges Stadium, and the second-place Washington D.C. Slayers hosted the third-place Philadelphia Fight at Duke Ellington Field.  The games were won by New Haven and Philadelphia, who went on to the inaugural Grand Final on August 27. Philadelphia defeated New Haven 28–26, winning their first ever national championship.

References

External links 
  

USARL season
USA Rugby League
Seasons in American rugby league
2011 in American sports